Selanikli Mehmed Nâzım Bey also known as Doktor Nazım (1870 – 26 August 1926) was a Turkish physician, politician, and revolutionary. Nazım Bey was a founding member of the Committee of Union and Progress, and served on its central committee for over ten years. He played a significant role in the Armenian genocide and the expulsion of Greeks in Western Anatolia. He was convicted for allegedly conspiring to assassinate Mustafa Kemal Atatürk in İzmir and was hanged in Ankara on 26 August 1926. He also served as the chairman of the Turkish sports club Fenerbahçe S.K. between 1916 and 1918.

Early life
Born in 1872 to a Dönmeh family, Mehmed Nazım was raised in Salonica; his family were longtime residents of the city, and were successful in running various businesses. His father Hacı Abdülhamid Efendi was from a Vardar (Macedonian) Turk clan and died while he was a baby. His mother was Ayşe Hanım.

Agitating against Abdul Hamid II 
After completing his secondary school education in Salonica, Nazım entered the Istanbul Military Medical High School in 1885 at the age of 15. After three years of education in this school, he entered the Military Medicine Academy. Influenced by the writings of Nâmık Kemal, and he founded the Society of Ottoman Union in the academy on 4 June, 1889 with a group of friends, and took active roles in the society in its early years. While continuing his education, in 1893, together with his classmates Ahmet Verdani and Ali Zühtü Bey, he went to Paris to establish connection with Ahmed Rıza's Young Turk faction, and united the two societies there and established the "Ottoman Progress and Union Committee" (later known as the Committee of Union and Progress) (CUP). Ahmed Rıza became the society's first president, and on 1 December 1895 Nazım helped Rıza to debut the newspaper Meşveret, which criticized Sultan Abdul Hamid II's regime, advocating for a democratic and secular "French style" of government and society instead.

The future of the Young Turks was put in jeopardy in 1896, when Abdul Hamid found out of an planned coup d'etat by the Unionists. While a massive crackdown on opposition took place in Constantinople, Yıldız Palace also put European governments under heavy pressure to deport the Young Turks. The French government affirmed the Porte's demands of deporting the Unionists, who settled in Switzerland after being deported from Belgium also. Rıza lost his chairmanship to Mizancı Murad during this time, who expelled Nazım and Rıza from the organization, but Rıza returned to the CUP chairmanship after Murad and several other Young Turks defected and returned to Constantinople to accept a pardon from Abdul Hamid. Nazım and Rıza's CUP eventually returned to Paris in 1899 with more personnel and capital than before.

With Prince Sabahattin's flight to Paris to join the Young Turks, a division surfaced in a 1902 congress that split the group between federalists and nationalists. An imperial firman declared Doctor Nâzım a traitor and sentenced him to death at this time for his role in Meşveret.

Outside of politics, Nazım enrolled in the Medical Faculty of Sorbonne University and completed his education in 1895. He became a gynecologist and started working at the Paris Hospital.

Lead up to 1908 

Nazım secretly returned to the Ottoman Empire and with Bahattin Şakir they organized CUP branches in Salonica and Smyrna with the aim to start a revolution. Staying in Midhat Şükrü's house in Salonica, Nazım was instrumental in the 1907 merger between the CUP and Ottoman Freedom Committee, led by Talat Bey. In Smyrna, he opened a shop that was a front for anti-Hamidian propaganda. He met with Mehmet Tahir, Halil Menteşe, gendarme commander Eşref Kuşçubaşı, and Çakırcalı Mehmet Efe in the lead up to 1908 revolution. When the revolution kicked off with Niyazi and Enver's flight into Albanian foothills, the Smyrna army corps was sent to Salonica to put down the revolt, but upon landing in the Salonican docks they defected in favor of the Young Turk revolutionaries. By July 23, Abdul Hamid II capitulated to the revolutionaries, and proclaimed the Second Constitutional Monarchy. Nazım heard the news of the revolution when he was at Milas and rushed to Salonica to gave a speech from the balcony of the London Hotel.

Balkan Wars 
Following the revolution, Nazım became a permanent member of the CUP's central committee while also continuing his medicinal career as the Chief Physician of the Municipal Hospital of Salonica, and was affiliated with the Red Crescent. He was offered general director of Anatolian Vilayets, but declined administrative work. With the CUP being suppressed after the 1912 coup d'etat, Nazım laid low in Salonica, but was taken prisoner by the Greeks on 9 November when they occupied the city during the First Balkan War. He was imprisoned in an Athens prison as a Turkish nationalist, only being repatriated two months before the start of World War I after the CUP reclaimed power and pressured the Greek government. The guards abused him and told him that his family had been killed, and that Constantinople was already occupied, while Anatolia would soon fall to the Greeks. He was deeply troubled by his family's fate (and that of his baby daughter) and the exile from his hometown. Upon returning, he called attention to Bulgarian komitadji atrocities committed against Muslims and "call[ed] for vengeance against the remaining Ottoman Christians" in his newspaper articles . The Ottoman defeat and the ethnic cleansing of Muslims was traumatic for many Young Turks and led to a desire for revenge; Nazım's "transformation from a patriotic doctor into a rabid, vindictive nationalist... symbolized the fate of many others".

World War I 

Doctor Nazım's return led to his concern that the Turks were economically poor here. He organized economic congresses and encouraged entrepreneurship. He established a collective grocery company in Rumelihisarı. Although he wanted to join the army to fight, it was found more appropriate he remained in the central committee. Sources don't agree on whether Nazım supported joining World War I or staying neutral. Upon the suggestions of Dr. Hamid Hüsnü (Kayacan), a close friend and former president of Fenerbahçe, with whom he worked with during their exile in Paris Nazım became president of Fenerbahçe Sports Club between 1915-16. Later, together with Celâl Sahir (Erozan), he first published the "Halka Doğru" magazine in Smyrna and helped in the establishment of the Turkish Hearths.

On July 21 1918, Talat Pasha insisted Nazım join his cabinet, which he reluctantly did as Minister of Education. Nazım meticulously protected state property and was never transported by the car reserved for cabinet members.

Role in the Armenian genocide 
Nazım was a leading figure in the Turkification of the Ottoman Empire. He was a member of the Teşkilât-ı Mahsusa (Special Organization in the Ottoman Empire). Many members of this organization eventually participated in the Turkish national movement and had played special roles in the Armenian Genocide.

In a speech delivered on during the closing remarks of a Committee of Union and Progress meeting, Nazım said:

And continued by saying, "the procedure this time will be one of total annihilation-it is necessary that not even one single Armenian survive this annihilation".

During one of the secret meetings of the Young Turks, Nazım was quoted as saying, "The massacre is necessary. All the non-Turkish elements, whatever nation they belong to, should be exterminated". In February 1915, two months prior to the commencement of the Armenian Genocide, Nazım declared a new government policy which would "produce total annihilation" in which would be "essential that no Armenian survives". He has been noted to have said that the Ottoman Empire should be "freeing the fatherland of the aspirations of this cursed race" when referring to the Armenians.

Exile in Russia and Germany 
Doctor Nazım was one of the eight Unionists that fled the Ottoman Empire on a German torpedo boat on 2 November 1918 following the signing of the Mudros Armistice. Due to his role in the Armenian genocide, Nazım was sentenced to death in absentia by the Turkish Courts-Martial of 1919–1920, but this was never carried out due to him having fled to Berlin. While in Berlin, he participated in the establishment of the Society of Islamic Revolutions, an anti-Entente Islamist organization. When he learned that Enver Pasha had been arrested by the Bolsheviks, he went to Moscow and after negotiating his release from prison, he returned to Berlin to open an office to support the Turkish nationalists in their fight against Entente forces. He went to Moscow and Batumi in 1921, where he carried out the work of the Islamic Revolution Society. Nazım convinced Enver Pasha from entering Anatolia and becoming an opponent of Mustafa Kemal Pasha. Meanwhile, he too wrote to Mustafa Kemal Pasha multiple times that he wished to return to Anatolia to help the Turkish revolutionaries but did not get a response. 

He met with Cemal Pasha in Çarçu and worked to organize the Turks of Bukhara with Enver. Hearing the news that the Turks won the Battle of Sakarya, he and Enver Pasha parted ways. Nazım then lived in Germany for a while with police protection due to his fellow Unionists Talat Pasha, Sait Halim Pasha, Bahattin Şakir, Cemal Azmi and Cemal Pasha, being assassinated by Armenian Dashnaks (see Operation Nemisis). He tried to have a bust of Talat Pasha made following his assassination. With the help of his close friend, Nâzım Hikmet, he began to write his memoirs, but he could not complete them or publish them.

Last years 
After the recapture of Smyrna, he was allowed to return to Turkey provided that he did not engage in political activities. Returning in 1922, he continued meeting with former Unionists, especially with his brother-in-law the Foreign Minister Dr. Tevfik Rüştü Aras. 

On 17 June, 1926 Doctor Nazım was among the Unionists arrested for beıng accused of organizing a plot against Mustafa Kemal's life in Smyrna. He was brought to Ankara after he was arrested on 1 July, and was tried by the Ankara Independence Tribunal. He denied the allegations against him, saying that he had no knowledge or guilt about this incident. No questions were asked about his involvement in the alleged assassination, and he was questioned throughout the court only about his activities during the period of Unionist rule. The following crimes were attributed to him by the court board and the prosecution's indictment:

 Working abroad with Enver Pasha against the Ankara Government in a secret organization during the armistice years as well as participation in the Batumi Congress. 
 Attending the meeting held at Cavit Bey's house. 
 Providing material and moral support to the Progressive Republican Party and to write a letter to Şükrü Bey about the election results in İzmir.

He was sentenced to death for the third time of his life and was executed by hanging at Cebeci on Thursday night, 26 August, 1926.

Personal life 
Mehmed Nazım met Beria Hanım, the daughter of Refik Bey of the Evliyazade family in Smyrna, and later married her in 1909.

References 

1870 births
1926 deaths
Politicians from Thessaloniki
Macedonian Turks
People convicted by the Ottoman Special Military Tribunal
People executed by Turkey by hanging
People executed for treason against Turkey
20th-century executions for treason
Executed Turkish people
Fenerbahçe S.K. presidents
19th-century physicians from the Ottoman Empire
20th-century physicians from the Ottoman Empire
People in health professions from Thessaloniki
Committee of Union and Progress politicians
Greek genocide perpetrators
Armenian genocide perpetrators
Executed mass murderers